Joyce Ellen Leader (born 1942) is a former American foreign service officer who served as the American ambassador to Guinea from 1999 to 2000. She succeeded Tibor P. Nagy and was succeeded by R. Barrie Walkley. She is a specialist in African and refugee affairs and is currently a visiting scholar at Georgetown University in the Edmund A. Walsh School of Foreign Service, and was formerly a Senior Fellow at The Fund for Peace, where she authored "Rwanda’s Struggle for Democracy and Peace, 1991–1994".

References

1942 births
Living people
Walsh School of Foreign Service faculty
Ambassadors of the United States to Guinea
United States Foreign Service personnel
American women ambassadors
American women academics
20th-century American diplomats
20th-century American women
21st-century American women